George Jackson Bentham (1863-21 October 1929) was a British Liberal Party politician.

Background
He was born as George Jackson in Hull in 1863, the son of William and Sarah Jackson. He was educated at Hull and privately. He married Ada Marshall, daughter of Thomas and Ann Marshall. They had two daughters. He assumed the name of Bentham by special licence.

Career
He was Managing Director for Jackson & Son, Ltd, general food providers. He was a member of Hull City Council from 1892 to 1910. He served as a Justice of the Peace in the East Riding, and also in the city of Hull. He contested the safe Conservative seat of Central Hull at the 1906 General Election, and finished second. He served as Member of Parliament for the seat of Gainsborough, Lincolnshire from 1910 to 1918. The Liberal Party had won the seat at the 1906 election but their candidate subsequently defected to the Liberal Unionists. The local Liberal selected Bentham to replace him and he held the seat at both the General Elections of 1910.
At the end of the war he defended his seat against a Unionist who had received the endorsement of the Coalition Government, and was defeated;

He did not stand for parliament again.

Sources
Who Was Who
British parliamentary election results 1885–1918, Craig, F. W. S.

References

External links 
Who Was Who; http://www.ukwhoswho.com

1863 births
1929 deaths
Liberal Party (UK) MPs for English constituencies
UK MPs 1910
UK MPs 1910–1918